The Baltimore & Annapolis Railroad was an American railroad of central Maryland built in the 19th century.  The railroad, the second to serve Annapolis, ran between Annapolis and Clifford along the north shore of the Severn River. From Clifford, just north of the present day Patapsco Light Rail Stop, it connected with the B&O's Curtis Bay branch so that trains could travel to Baltimore. In 1921, when it was called the Annapolis and Baltimore Short Line, it was purchased by the larger Washington, Baltimore and Annapolis Electric Railway (WB&A), and then emerged from the WB&A's 1935 bankruptcy and closure as the Baltimore & Annapolis Railroad. B&A electric passenger operation between the two cities continued until 1950, at which time the rail line became solely a freight carrier, operating buses for passenger service. Freight service to Annapolis continued until June 1968 when the Severn River Trestle was declared unsafe. In the 1980s, the line was completely shut down. The right-of-way now serves as part of Baltimore's light rail system and as the Baltimore & Annapolis Trail.

Annapolis and Baltimore Short Line

Origins
The Baltimore & Annapolis Railroad was chartered in 1880, by a group of New England promoters as the Annapolis and Baltimore Short Line and began running in March 1887. This freight and passenger line was an integral link between Annapolis and Baltimore, transporting almost two million passengers per year until competition from nearby highways forced the railroads' closure. It was the second railroad to serve Annapolis and provided a faster connection to Baltimore, taking a more direct path along the north shore of the Severn River and then crossing the river into Annapolis.  The railroad transformed the once-secluded banks of the Severn to a series of suburban communities.

The railroad started as a steam powered line running from Bladen Street in Annapolis, crossing the wide Severn River estuary on a long timber trestle, and on to Clifford on the B&O line, where it used the B&O tracks to terminate at Camden Station in Baltimore. Because the A&B Short Line created an almost straight line southeast from Baltimore it snatched much of the Baltimore-Annapolis trade away from the Annapolis, Washington & Baltimore Railroad on which passengers had to change trains at Annapolis Junction.

At some point prior to 1892, a small connecting line was built between the A&B and the AW&B at the Bay Ridge Junction wye where the AW&B met the Annapolis and Bay Ridge Railroad.

Reorganization
Business was slim in the early years, and in 1893 the railroad was sold to George Burnham Jr. and reorganized as the Baltimore & Annapolis Short Line the next year. Universally it was called simply “The Annapolis Short Line.”

Modernization

The line was electrified in 1908, and changed its name to the Maryland Electric Railways Company, providing clean, comfortable, faster, and more frequent service.  Unlike most electric railways of its time, which employed a low voltage Direct Current electrification, the line installed a 6,600 volt, 25 cycle, single phase Alternating Current electrification system newly developed by the Westinghouse Electric & Manufacturing Company. The pioneering AC system was less than fully successful, however, and in 1914, new owners switched to DC.  When it did, the B&O was wary of a high-voltage overhead line over its tracks between the Clifford interchange and Camden Station. (Both the WB&A and Short Line then used 3300v AC) So the B&O built a new line for the Short Line between Cliffords and its mainline at Russell Street, paralleling the South Baltimore branch through Westport. This line ran immediately west/south of the Curtis Bay and South Baltimore branches, passing under the Curtis Bay branch along the way.

Purchase
During its heyday, the years between 1918 and the late 1920s, the B&A transported as many as 1,750,000 passengers per year between Baltimore and Annapolis. Trains left every hour from 6 am through 11 pm (during rush hours, the trains left every 30 minutes). Because of its strong performance, the neighboring WB&A bought the Annapolis Short Line in 1921 and it became part of the WB&A system in which it was called the North Shore Line. Afterward, Short Line trains were routed over the WB&A between Linthicum and the WB&A's new Baltimore terminal at the corner of Howard & Lombard Streets, now the site of a Holiday Inn. At the same time, most of the old Short Line track between Linthicum and Westport was abandoned, except for a section between Baltimore Highlands and the B&O Cliffords interchange which was kept to handle freight to and from the B&O. The "new" (B&O-built) Annapolis Short Line ROW between Cliffords and Westport was also retained for freight interchange, though this segment was later abandoned in 1979

Emergence from Bankruptcy
Gross receipts for the WB&A began to decline almost as soon as it bought the B&A in 1921. For the next decade, the WB&A only survived because of a law exempting it from taxes. In January 1931, the extension of the law failed to pass by one vote and the line went into receivership.
The line remained in operation for four more years until it officially ceased on August 20, 1935. The WB&A was sold at public auction with scrap dealers buying most of the rolling stock. The right-of-way and some equipment were bought by the Bondholders Protective Society who then formed the Baltimore and Annapolis Railroad Company. This company negotiated an agreement with the B&O to use Camden Station as its Baltimore terminal. The new company took over on August 21, 1935 for continuous operation.  The company also entered the motor bus business, later serving Fort Meade from both Baltimore and Annapolis, plus other points not reached by its rails.

World War II
With the start of World War II and gas rationing, the B&A often ran with all available equipment in service. At semester breaks, holidays and graduation times the trains were packed with midshipmen from the United States Naval Academy, and the B&O ran steam trains to pick up teams and supporters to transport them to Philadelphia for the Army-Navy games. The B&A typically  trains between Baltimore and Glen Burnie, with 3-cars continuing on the additional  to Annapolis.

End of the Line

Following World War II, gasoline and cars came back. By 1949, the B&A offered scheduled commuter bus service between Baltimore, Glen Burnie, and Annapolis, along with its passenger rail service, and reported an operating deficit of $100,000 on an annualized basis. A proposal for the line to be acquired by the B&O Railroad for freight service was discarded when the B&O's studies concluded it would require $1.35 million in infrastructure improvements to bring it up to Class 1 railroad standards. By June, 1949, the developer of a new housing community near Glen Burnie complained in Architectural Forum magazine that the rumored discontinuation of "rail rapid transit" was adversely affecting sales to buyers, "who don't want to ride busses on congested streets". 

At a hearing in November 1949, the Maryland Public Service Commission reported "The rails are worn and would have to be replaced if passenger service is continued; the cars and trains are antiquated, decrepit, and unattractive means of travel; schedules are slow, and there is no inducement, save that of necessity, for anyone to travel the area by rail. While not yet dead, it is moribund”. The B&A substituted buses for rail service; on February 5, 1950, the B&A Short Line made its final passenger run. The electric wires were removed, but the railroad remained intact for diesel-operated freight service. The B&A purchased a diesel that remained in freight service to Annapolis until June 1968 when the Severn River Trestle was embargoed. 

The freight was now terminated at Jones Station where Annapolis Lumber and Supply Company sent trucks to collect freight. At this time, the Naval Academy converted their power and heating systems from coal to oil. By the early 1970s, all that remained in service was a six-mile (10 km) stub to Glen Burnie. The remaining B&A rail freight service ended in 1986.

The Baltimore & Annapolis Railroad's public bus system was absorbed by Maryland Transit Administration (MTA) in 1973 as Route 14. The company continued as a charter bus service using motorcoaches into the mid-1980s, but eventually ceased service.

The remaining line north of Glen Burnie was shut down in the early 1980s and sold to the State of Maryland in 1991 to serve as the southern leg of the light rail system. In 1986, B&A number 50 was donated to the B&O Railroad Museum.

Rebirth
In 1990, the southern portion of the right-of-way was reborn as the Baltimore & Annapolis Rail Trail. In June 1993, light rail began running on the northern portion between Baltimore and Cromwell station in Glen Burnie.

Baltimore and Annapolis in the Carolinas

On February 9, 1995, the Baltimore and Annapolis Railroad Company, by that time merely an entity on paper, filed to acquire and operate approximately 75.9 miles of rail line from the Mid Atlantic Railroad, which operated track between Mullin's, SC and Whiteville NC, and between Chadbourn, NC and Conway, SC.  The filing also noted that the B&A had not owned any rail lines since May 1991, when the state of Maryland took its last right of way through a condemnation proceeding to build a light rail line. This line was operated under the name Carolina Southern Railroad (reporting marks CALA). All public business outside of federal railroad filings were performed under the auspices of the CALA. In June of 2001, the Waccamaw Coast Line  Railroad (WCLR), a new division of the B&A, filed to operate 14.1 miles of railroad owned by Horry County, SC between the current terminus of the CALA in Conway, SC and the city of Myrtle Beach, SC where the line ended.  The WCLR had operated under the direct ownership of the county prior to its ownership by the B&A. The right of way continued to be owned by the county and was initially leased to the B&A for a period of 30 years. 

The B&A's operation and major ownership of railroad lines in the Carolinas ended on December 18, 2015, with the sale of all but one mile of its CALA rail lines to the R.J. Corman Railroad Group, operating under a new railroad for this line, R. J. Corman Railroad Company/Carolina Lines, LLC (RJCS). The one additional mile that remains under the ownership of the CALA was leased to the RJCS. The company also retained ownership of the Conway, SC depot and other land assets along the right of way.  The railroad lines had been out of service since 2011 due to Federal Railroad Administration (FRA) orders to repair bridges along the line, which the company could not afford to perform. Horry County had placed the railroad in default over lack of lease payments during this time period.  The B&A has not operated publicly under the name Baltimore and Annapolis Railroad Company during its time owning and operating rail lines in the Carolinas, but does roster one former  C&O EMD SW9 in B&A paint (#87), and a former  N&W boxcar lettered for the B&A which are still stored in Chadbourn, North Carolina, as of May 2019.

Stations

 Baltimore
Carroll (B&O station at Monroe Street)
(Junction with B&O in Westport just south of the crossing of the Western Maryland Railway Tide Subdivision)
Clifford (north of Patapsco Avenue, next to the B&O Curtis Bay Branch)
Baltimore Highlands (between Georgia and Illinois Avenues, across from the Washington, Baltimore and Annapolis Electric Railroad station)
Pumphrey (Baltimore Annapolis Boulevard and Belle Grove Road, where the latter now curves)
 Linthicum Heights (Maple Road)
 Shipley (Camp Meade Road)
 Woodlawn Heights
 Garland
 Ferndale (earlier Wellham) (Wellham Avenue)
Cromwell (I-97)
 Glen Burnie (Crain Highway)
 Saunders Range
 Oakwood (Oakwood Road)
 Marley (Marley Station Mall)
 Elvaton (Elvaton Road)
 Pasadena (formerly Pleasantena) 
 Earleigh Heights (Earleigh Heights Road) (formerly Frost)
 Robinson (Robinson Road)
 Boone Station (later Severna Park)
 Round Bay (Round Bay Road)
 Jones (Jones Station Road)
 Revell (Old County Road)
 Joyce (Joyce Lane)
 Arnold (Arnold Road) 
 Asberry (Severn Way)
 Winchester (Winchester Road)
 Severnside
 Wardour (Wardour Drive, where the railway crossed the Severn River)
 West Annapolis
 Annapolis (at the Bladen Street terminus)

Surviving landmarks

Rights of way
The Hunt Valley-Glen Burnie MTA Light Rail system utilizes several portions of the former B&A railway:
Cromwell Station in Glen Burnie to a point north of Maple Road, where it moves onto the original WB&A right-of-way
Baltimore Highlands to Patapsco Avenue Station
Continues on a "new" B&A right-of-way to Westport, passing under the CSX line on a bridge originally built in 1908 to carry the B&O over the B&A
leaves the B&A at Waterview Avenue.

The Baltimore & Annapolis Trail uses the right-of-way from Glen Burnie to Arnold, just outside Annapolis.

Extant track
 The B&A switch remains at Clifford and connects CSXT's Curtis Bay Branch with the Light Rail. Though it exists, this switch is no longer used. 
 A section of track still exists at the intersection of Baltimore Annapolis Blvd and Jones Station Rd. 
 A dual section of track still exists under the power lines in an overgrowth area just north of the intersection of Jumpers Hole Road.
 Another section of extant track extends from the Annapolis side of the Severn River to Annapolis Street.

Other features
 Extant bridge abutments over the Patapsco River downstream from the light rail bridge.
B&A #50 a GE (General Electric) 70 ton diesel locomotive survives at the B&O railroad museum in Baltimore Maryland.
B&A #87 an EMD SW9 survives stored in Chadbourn, NC along with a BLA lettered boxcar #41449.

Buildings
The following stations are still standing:
 Earleigh Heights Station: now the Park Ranger Station and B&A Railroad Museum
 Linthicum Heights Station
 Severna Park Station

The following former stations are currently private residences:
Round Bay Station
Revell Station (at Old County & Baltimore Annapolis Blvd)
Woodlawn Station

References

External links

Baltimore & Annapolis Trail Park
Baltimore & Ohio Railroad Museum
Baltimore Light Rail Relics
History of the B&A Railroad
Photos of the rolling stock

Defunct Maryland railroads
Interurban railways in Maryland
Railway lines opened in 1887
1887 establishments in Maryland
Railway lines closed in 1980
1980 disestablishments in Maryland